Girard station is a subway station on the SEPTA Broad Street Line in the Francisville section of North Philadelphia, Pennsylvania. It is an express station, with four tracks and two central platforms. This is the last station where southbound riders can transfer freely between the Ridge Spur line and the Main Line, and the two trains commonly meet here and wait for one another. Girard station is located in a very busy commercial strip along Girard Avenue, and also serves the southernmost sections of Temple University. A transfer is available to the Route 15 trolley, which provides local service along Girard Avenue.

Girard station is the 10th busiest station on the Broad Street subway line, with 7,500 passengers a day.

The station was featured prominently in the 2019 sci-fi movie In the Shadow of the Moon.

Station layout

References

External links

 Girard Avenue entrance from Google Maps Street View
 Trolley Station from Google Maps Street View

SEPTA Broad Street Line stations
Railway stations in Philadelphia
Railway stations in the United States opened in 1928
Railway stations located underground in Pennsylvania
SEPTA Route 15 stations